Marxer is a surname. Notable people with the surname include:

Anne-Flore Marxer (born 1984), Swiss snowboarder
Anton Marxer (1880-?), German veterinarian, chemist and bacteriologist
Gunilla Marxer-Kranz (born 1972), Liechtenstein politician
Herbert Marxer (born 1952), Liechtenstein alpine skier
Manuela Marxer (born 1965), Liechtenstein athlete
Marlies Amann-Marxer (born 1952), Liechtenstein politician
Melitta Marxer (1923–2015), Liechtensteinerin activist 
Surnames of Liechtenstein origin

German-language surnames